Ilya Aleksandrovich Gultyayev (born 5 September 1988) is a Russian association football defender. He plays for Dynamo Vologda.

Career
While being registered for FC Spartak Moscow since 2006, Gultyayev made his professional debut for the team on 15 July 2009, coming as a half-time substitute in the Russian Cup game against FC Krasnodar.

On 4 January 2016, Bogdan left FC Yenisey Krasnoyarsk, signing for FC Tosno.

Banants
On 5 September 2018, Gultyayev signed for FC Banants. On 6 February 2019, Banants announced that Gultyayev had left the club by mutual consent.

References

External links
 Profile at the official website of Tom 
 
 

1988 births
People from Vologda
Living people
Russian footballers
Russia under-21 international footballers
Association football defenders
Russian expatriate footballers
Expatriate footballers in Armenia
Expatriate footballers in Belarus
Russian Premier League players
FC Spartak Moscow players
FC Tom Tomsk players
FC Ufa players
FC Neftekhimik Nizhnekamsk players
FC Yenisey Krasnoyarsk players
FC Tosno players
FC Urartu players
FC Gomel players
FC Tambov players
FC Amkar Perm players
FC Dynamo Vologda players
Footballers from Vologda